Charles Grant Braidwood (October 15, 1903 – January 8, 1945) was a professional American football player who played end for four seasons for the Portsmouth Spartans, Cleveland Indians, Chicago Cardinals, and Cincinnati Reds.

After ending his playing career, Braidwood was a wrestling referee in Tennessee. During World War II, he was an American Red Cross program director, working overseas to help the Allied war effort. While serving in the Red Cross, he died of a heart attack on Biak Island. He is buried in Fort William McKinley in Manila, Philippines.

Braidwood was the son of James Grant Braidwood (1865–1935) and Cornelia Mayerhofernee McDole (1864–1921). He was one of 4 children; his siblings were Louise I Braidwood, Andrew W. Braidwood and Edna Braidwood.

References

External links

 

1903 births
1945 deaths
American football ends
Cincinnati Reds (NFL) players
Cleveland Indians (NFL 1931) players
Chattanooga Mocs football players
Chicago Cardinals players
Loyola Ramblers football players
Portsmouth Spartans players
Players of American football from Chicago
American Red Cross personnel
American civilians killed in World War II